Kenneth Solan (13 October 1948 – 23 November 1971) was an English professional footballer who made a total of 14 appearances in the Football League, before dying in a car crash at the age of 23.

Career
Solan began his career as a youth player at hometown club Middlesbrough, and spent loan spells at Hartlepool United and Darlington. Solan never made a league appearance for Middlesbrough.

Death
Solan died in a car crash on 23 November 1971, at the age of 23.

References

1943 births
1971 deaths
English footballers
Middlesbrough F.C. players
Hartlepool United F.C. players
Darlington F.C. players
Road incident deaths in England
Association football forwards